Bulle Hassan Mo'allim (died August 24, 2010) was a Somali politician, a member of the Transitional Federal Parliament.  He was among the people killed in the attack on the Hotel Muna in Mogadishu by al-Shabaab as were fellow parliamentarians Mohamed Hassan M. Nur, Geddi Abdi Gadid, and Idiris Muse Elmi.

References

2010 deaths
Members of the Transitional Federal Parliament
Assassinated Somalian politicians
People murdered in Somalia
Year of birth missing